Ruben Aguilar (born 26 April 1993) is a French professional footballer who plays as a right-back for Ligue 1 club Monaco and the France national team.

Early life
Ruben Aguilar was born on 26 April 1993 in Grenoble, Isère.

Club career
Aguilar joined Auxerre in 2014 from Grenoble. He made his Ligue 2 debut on 1 August 2014 against Le Havre in a 2–0 home win. In the 2016–17 season, he played 30 league matches for Auxerre.

In May 2017, Aguilar signed with Montpellier. On 6 August 2019, he joined Monaco on a five-year deal.

International career
On 9 November 2020, Aguilar was called-up to the France national team for the first time, having previously never played for France at any level.

Personal life
Aguilar was born in Grenoble, Isère to a French mother and a Spanish father. He was once called to the Bolivia national team even though he has no Bolivian descent, due to a Football Manager database mismatch.

Career statistics

Club

International

References

External links

Profile at the AS Monaco FC website

1993 births
Living people
Sportspeople from Grenoble
Footballers from Auvergne-Rhône-Alpes
French footballers
Association football defenders
Grenoble Foot 38 players
AJ Auxerre players
Montpellier HSC players
AS Monaco FC players
Ligue 2 players
Ligue 1 players
France international footballers
French expatriate footballers
Expatriate footballers in Monaco
French expatriate sportspeople in Monaco
French people of Spanish descent